During the 1949–50 season Juventus Football Club competed in Serie A.

Summary 
The team clinched its 8th title despite a colossal 1–7 home defeat against Milan with a superb hat-trick of Swedish striker Gunnar Nordahl. The championship was a reward to chairman Gianni Agnelli who built this team buying Danish players unknown at the time. In the summer he transferred in an Argentinian midfielder Rinaldo Martino from San Lorenzo to boost the club performance.

In this season, Jesse Carver replaced fellow Englishman William Chalmers as head coach of Juventus, and a less rigid and physically demanding training schedule paid off for Hansen. In the club, Hansen had an irreplaceable partner in another Danish player from the 1948 Olympics team, Karl Aage Præst. Præst was a left winger with electric dribbling skills who scattered opponents through the field and produced precise crosses to Hansen, who netted them thanks to his violent and accurate headers. Juventus won the 1949–50 Serie A championship with Hansen scoring 28 goals in 37 games.

Squad 
Source:

Competitions

Serie A

League table

Matches

Statistics

Squad statistics
Source:

Players statistics

Appearances
36.Alberto Bertuccelli
8.Romolo Bizzotto
35.Giampiero Boniperti
1.Filippo Cavalli
37.John Hansen
35.Sergio Manente
38.Giacomo Mari
1.Amos Mariani
33.Rinaldo Martino
34.Ermes Muccinelli
35.Carlo Parola
32.Alberto Piccinini
37.Karl Aage Præst
6.Pietro Rava
3.Ermanno Scaramuzzi
37.Giovanni Viola
10.Pasquale Vivolo

Goalscorers
28.John Hansen
21.Giampiero Boniperti
18.Rinaldo Martino
13.Ermes Muccinelli
11.Karl Aage Præst
4.Giacomo Mari
2.Carlo Parola
2.Alberto Piccinini
1.Pasquale Vivolo

References

External links
 
 

Juventus F.C. seasons
Juventus
Italian football championship-winning seasons